Sinitsyn, Sinicyn or Sinitsin (from синица meaning tit) is a Russian masculine surname, its feminine counterpart is Sinitsyna, Sinicyna or Sinitsina. It may refer to
Anastasia Sinitsyna (born 1983), Russian handball player
Anastassia Sinitsina (born 2004), Estonian chess master
Andrei Sinitsyn (born 1988), Russian football player
Andrѐy V. Sinitsyn (born 1939, died 2014), Russian geologist
Boris Sinitsyn (born 1953), Russian football coach and former player
Dmitry Sinitsyn (born 1973), Russian nordic combined athlete
Dmitry Sinitsyn (ice hockey) (born 1994), Russian ice hockey player
Rostislav Sinicyn (born 1955), Soviet ice dancer 
Valerie Sinitsin (born 1992), Russian ice dancer
Victoria Sinitsina (born 1995), Russian ice dancer

Russian-language surnames